If  is a category, then a -graded category is a category  together with a functor
.

Monoids and groups can be thought of as categories with a single object. A monoid-graded or group-graded category is therefore one in which to each morphism is attached an element of a given monoid (resp. group), its grade. This must be compatible with composition, in the sense that compositions have the product grade.

Definition

There are various different definitions of a graded category, up to the most abstract one given above.  A more concrete definition of a graded abelian category is as follows:

Let  be an abelian category and  a monoid. If

  for all  and
  is a full and faithful functor for every 

we say that  is a -graded category.

See also 
 Differential graded category
 Graded (mathematics)
 Graded algebra
 Slice category

References

Category theory